AmeriKKKa's Most Wanted is the debut studio album by American rapper Ice Cube, released on May 16, 1990, by Priority Records. It was his first solo album, after an acrimonious split from his former group N.W.A. The album was primarily produced by Public Enemy's production team The Bomb Squad. A critical and commercial success, it remains one of the defining hip hop albums of the 1990s.

Background

Conception
After departing from Ruthless Records and the West Coast–based group N.W.A, Ice Cube immediately moved to record his own album. Cube maintains that originally, he and N.W.A producer Dr. Dre still wanted to collaborate for Cube's debut solo, but the move was nixed by label powers:

Linking up with Sir Jinx, Dr. Dre's cousin, Cube made use of pre-written notebooks of songs meant for N.W.A member/Ruthless co-founder Eazy-E. After relocating to New York, they worked on the songs, which included "Once Upon a Time in the Projects", "Get Off My Dick & Tell Yo' Bitch to Come Here" and "Gangsta's Fairytale", among others. Under fire from his former group with the song "100 Miles and Runnin', from the EP of the same name, he also recorded the song "Jackin' for Beats", using beats allegedly planned for use on the next N.W.A album, though he would use this several months later on the Kill at Will EP.

After contacting Public Enemy's production team The Bomb Squad, they completed the album. The album received a fair share of production credited to various Bomb Squad members, with an appearance by Public Enemy frontman Chuck D, despite Jinx's claims that the only Bomb Squad member fully present was Eric Sadler. Hank Shocklee spoke on meeting and working with Ice Cube in a Cool'eh Magazine interview:

Content
With socio-political conscious and gangsta rap content, its songs delve into the issues of ghetto life, drug addiction, racism and poverty. Throughout the album, Ice Cube incessantly attacks institutional racism, as well as social norms which directly or indirectly allowed the oppression of those living in the ghettos of Los Angeles to continue. On "Endangered Species (Tales from the Darkside)," he predicts that his neighborhood would become a flash point for violence before 1992's scandal over the beating of Rodney King, and takes police to task for the policies that would later lead to the L.A. riots that resulted.

Throughout the album, Cube takes some controversial stands, referring to certain types of African-Americans as "Oreo cookies", an epithet implying that they appear black on the outside, but have, internally, negative white tendencies. Arsenio Hall is specifically mentioned as being a "sell-out." Cube also heavily criticizes R&B and hip hop radio stations for watered-down broadcasting. The title song directly parodies the television show, America's Most Wanted, alleging bias and denouncing the glee the program displays in arresting African-American men.

A later skit, "The Drive By," returns to the same theme at the end, with newscaster Tom Brokaw reporting on rioting, stating: "Outside the south central area, few cared about the violence because it didn't affect them." He also addressed gender relations on "It's a Man's World", a duet between Cube and rapper Yo-Yo. Cube and Yo-Yo verbally spar and trade sexist barbs back and forth in an exposé of sexism between men and women. Amidst critics' accusing Ice Cube of sexism, Peter Watrous of The New York Times wrote, in review of a live show at New York's Apollo Theater:

Release
AmeriKKKa's Most Wanted initially charted without the support of a lead single or video, although the title track would later receive a pressing, and a rare video for "Who's the Mack?" eventually surfaced. It was directed by Alex Winter.

Singles 
The title track was the first official single from the album - the B-side for the song was "Once Upon a Time in the Projects". "Who's the Mack?" was released as a promo single and music video. A remix of the album track "Endangered Species (Tales From The Darkside)" was later released as a single the EP Kill at Will.

Critical reception 

Upon release, AmeriKKKa's Most Wanted received critical acclaim, and over the years it has been regarded by many as a hip-hop classic. Davis Mills from The Washington Post praised the album for its lyrical dexterity, stating: "Ice Cube has now proven that he was N.W.A's crucial element. He's an unusually gifted rhymer, and his delivery is even more self-assured." Greg Sandow from Entertainment Weekly called it "not necessarily cohesive art", but complimented the album's vivid depictions of urban realities and wrote that Ice Cube "emerges as a rapper most original for his uncompromising tone. He throws ghetto life in our faces and dares us to draw our own conclusions".

Rolling Stone originally gave the album 2½ out of 5 stars in 1990, with Alan Light commenting; "The relentless profanity grows wearisome, the Bomb Squad beats lose steam, and Cube's attitudes toward women are simply despicable." He also declared the album as "a disappointment." (Light wrote the liner notes for the 2003 CD reissue of the album, that also included the Kill at Will EP.) Rolling Stone, however, raised the rating to 3½ stars in 1992 and to 5 stars in 2004, and praised the album for its production, and lyrics. In a retrospective review, David Jeffries from AllMusic stated: "This street knowledge venom with ultra fast funk works splendidly throughout the album, with every track hitting home [...] AmeriKKKa's Most Wanted is a timeless, riveting exercise in anger, honesty, and the sociopolitical possibilities of hip-hop."

Accolades
The information regarding accolades is adapted from acclaimedMusic.net except for lists that are sourced otherwise.
(*) signifies unordered lists

Legacy
Ice Cube's social, and political commentary, delivered in an incisive manner, has influenced numerous rappers since Amerikkka's Most Wanted, particularly in the gangsta rap and political rap subgenres. Focusing on the hardships of life in South Central, Los Angeles, as well as criticizing the American Justice System and race relations in the United States, Cube became an outspoken voice of U.S. injustice against young Black Americans.

Although Ice Cube's popularity among mainstream listeners has lessened since the 2000s, and his sound may be considered distinctively old school to modern ears, many notable rappers themselves have been influenced by AmeriKKKa's Most Wanted. His style of rapping about real life sentiment and socio-political awareness influenced the music of West Coast rappers, including that of Tupac Shakur, Ras Kass, and Xzibit, as well as East Coast rappers Nas, The Notorious B.I.G., and more recently, Saigon, JPEGMafia and Southern rapper Young Jeezy. East Coast rapper Redman also covered "Once Upon a Time in the Projects" on his album Doc's Da Name 2000, with the song "Jersey Yo!".

Commercial performance
AmeriKKKas Most Wanted debuted at number 19 on the US Billboard 200 chart. It was certified gold by the Recording Industry Association of America (RIAA) two weeks after it was released for sales of over 500,000 copies. The album was eventually certified platinum four months later on September 16, 1990.

Track listing

Personnel

The Bomb Squad – producer
Mario Castellanos – photography
Chris Champion – assistant engineer
Chuck D. – performer
Da Lench Mob – vocals (background), producer
(Ex) Cat Heads – vocals (background)
Flavor Flav – vocals, performer
Ricky Harris – vocals (background)
Al Hayes – bass guitar, guitar
Vincent Henry – flute, saxophone
Brian Holt – vocals
Kevin Hosmann – art direction

Ice Cube – vocals, producer
Jay Dee – vocals (background)
Tim Rollins – piano
Eric Sadler – producer
Nick Sansano – engineer
Shannon – vocals (background)
Christopher Shaw – engineer
Keith Shocklee – scratching
Sir Jinx- vocals (background), producer
Chilly Chill – vocals (background), producer
Howie Weinberg – mastering
Dan Wood – vocals (background), engineer
Yo-Yo – vocals, performer

Charts

Weekly charts

Year-end charts

Certifications

Notes

References

External links
 AmeriKKKa's Most Wanted at Discogs
 Album Review at Hip Hop Connection
 Album Review at RapReviews.com

1990 debut albums
Ice Cube albums
Priority Records albums
Political hip hop albums
Political music albums by American artists
Albums recorded at Greene St. Recording